The 2002 Monaco Grand Prix was a Formula One motor race held on 26 May 2002 at the Circuit de Monaco in Monte Carlo. It was the seventh race of the 2002 Formula One World Championship, and the sixtieth Monaco Grand Prix.

The 78-lap race was won by British driver David Coulthard, driving a McLaren-Mercedes. Colombian Juan Pablo Montoya took pole position in his Williams-BMW but was beaten off the line by Coulthard, who went on to lead every lap. German Michael Schumacher finished second in a Ferrari with his brother, Ralf Schumacher, third in the other Williams-BMW.

Qualifying report
Juan Pablo Montoya emerged on top in qualifying. David Coulthard took pole position at the 2001 Monaco Grand Prix, only to stall on the grid, but was forced to settle for second this time, nearly four tenths of a second off the Colombian's pace. The championship leader and the last race victor, Michael Schumacher, could only set the third fastest time after suffering with an eye irritation throughout the session. Ralf Schumacher lined up fourth, ahead of Rubens Barrichello's Ferrari and Kimi Räikkönen's McLaren.

Throughout free practice, the Renault team, and in particular Jarno Trulli, had looked set to challenge the established front-runners, but the Italian would only line up in 7th position, one position ahead of team-mate Jenson Button. On their first appearance at Monaco, the Toyotas of Mika Salo and Allan McNish completed the top ten, ahead of Giancarlo Fisichella's Jordan and Heinz-Harald Frentzen's Arrows. Sauber had a troubled session, with Felipe Massa and Nick Heidfeld lining up 13th and 17th respectively. The 1996 winner Olivier Panis was 18th for BAR, while Eddie Irvine lined up in 21st for Jaguar.

Qualifying classification

Race report
Coulthard made the most of a sluggish start from Montoya to take the lead into Sainte-Devote for the first time, as Michael Schumacher held third position from his brother. Meanwhile, there was commotion behind, as Jacques Villeneuve's BAR failed to get off the grid with clutch problems. The Canadian would rejoin the race one lap down. There were also problems for Button, who incurred a drive-through penalty for jumping the start, despite the fact he then bogged down, and had dropped nine places to 17th by the end of the first lap. At the front, Coulthard remained in the lead, but unable to strengthen his advantage, with the top four rarely covered by more than a second. The Scot did gradually increase his advantage and by the time a dozen laps had been run, Coulthard's lead was up to just over a second, with Montoya holding off Michael Schumacher by a similar amount.

However, the top Williams was having problems keeping pace with the lead car, and was gradually dropping back, delaying Schumacher in the process. The German was the first of the front-runners to stop - doing so on lap 44, and therefore removing the slower Montoya from his path, before, ironically the Colombian was forced out with engine failure later that lap. Schumacher had clearly been delayed by the slower Williams, as he emerged from the pits to set the fastest lap of the race and close in on Coulthard. With the Scot's tyres much more worn than Schumacher's, the McLaren team had no choice but to call in Coulthard early, with the Scot rejoining with a one-second advantage. Now armed with new tyres himself, Coulthard had the measure of Schumacher, and although the pair circulated nose-to-tail for the remainder of the race, Coulthard recorded his first victory for over a year, while Michael Schumacher's second position extended his championship lead to 33 points.

There was plenty of action further down the field, with Ralf Schumacher taking third, despite a late pit-stop to replace a damaged tyre. Trulli followed up his promising times earlier in the weekend by holding off the Jordan of Giancarlo Fisichella for fourth position. Behind Fisichella, Heinz-Harald Frentzen took sixth place, although had it not been for a fuel rig problem that necessitated an extra pit-stop, he could well have taken fourth. Rubens Barrichello's disappointing weekend ended with seventh position, after making a second pit-stop to repair damage caused by smashing into Räikkönen at the chicane, in a move that put the McLaren driver out of the race. Barrichello received a 10-second stop-go penalty for causing the accident. Nick Heidfeld took eighth, ahead of the Jaguars of Eddie Irvine and Pedro de la Rosa. Minardi's Mark Webber had been on target for a top ten finish, only to have to make a late pit-stop which dropped him to eleventh. Enrique Bernoldi was the twelfth and last finisher, despite damaging his car in a clash with Massa and incurring a drive-through penalty for cutting the chicane.

Allan McNish spun his Toyota into the tyres at Sainte-Devote on lap 15. Takuma Sato clattered into the barriers before the chicane on lap 22 while trying to let his Jordan team-mate Fisichella past. Minardi's Alex Yoong was another driver to clash with the barriers, and although he made it back to the pits, his suspension was too damaged for him to continue. Panis and Button collided at Sainte-Devote on lap 51 and were forced out with accident damage, Panis subsequently admitting he had not seen the Renault on the inside of him. More spectacular was the shunt that ended Massa's race after his Sauber was badly damaged after a confrontation with the Sainte-Devote tyre wall. Jacques Villeneuve had earlier departed with an engine failure, while Toyota's Mika Salo was the final retirement of the day after brake failure forced him into the barriers.

Race classification

Championship standings after the race 

Drivers' Championship standings

Constructors' Championship standings

References

Monaco Grand Prix
Monaco Grand Prix
Grand Prix
May 2002 sports events in Europe